Tomás Lasansky (born 1957) is an American artist. He lives in Iowa City, Iowa. His work relates to the Native American culture of the south-western United States. He is the son of Mauricio Lasansky.

Lasansky learned the standard techniques of printmaking – hard- and soft-ground etching, engraving, aquatint, scraping and burnishing – from his father, and in the early 1970s began working as his printing assistant.

References

Further reading 

 Stewart Oksenhorn (February 22, 2008). A unique perspective from a family art man. The Aspen Times Weekly. 
 Evan Gillespie (February 5, 2015). Lasansky exhibit highlights father's influence. South Bend Tribune.
 Mauricio and Tomás Lasansky: Father and Son. South Bend, IN: Snite Museum of Art, University of Notre Dame.

Painters from Iowa
American people of Argentine descent
American printmakers
Modern printmakers
University of Iowa alumni
Living people
1957 births